Thomas Patrick Mullens (13 April 1900 – 9 August 1961) was an Australian rules footballer who played with Carlton and Footscray in the Victorian Football League (VFL).

Notes

External links 

Tom Mullens's profile at Blueseum

1900 births
1961 deaths
Footscray Football Club (VFA) players
Western Bulldogs players
Carlton Football Club players
Australian rules footballers from Ballarat